Tejeda de Tiétar is a municipality located in the province of Cáceres, Extremadura, western Spain.

As of 2010, the population is 883.

References

Municipalities in the Province of Cáceres